Arachnoid may refer to:

 Relating to arachnids
 Arachnoid (astrogeology), a geological structure found only on the planet Venus
 Arachnoid (botany), referring to organs with a cobwebby exterior appearance
 Arachnoid granulation, small protrusions of the arachnoid mater
 Arachnoid mater, a layer of the meninges, membranes that contain the central nervous system

See also
 Arkanoid, an arcade game